Fritillaria gibbosa is a species of herbaceous perennial plant in the lily family Liliaceae. It is native to Afghanistan, Iran, Pakistan, Turkmenistan, and Transcaucasia.

The flowers are rotate (wide open and nearly flat) rather than bell-shaped as in most of the species in the genus, and pink with darker spots.

References

External links
Pacific Bulb Society, Asian Fritillaria Two photos of several species including Fritillaria gibbosa
Alpine Garden Society, Plant Portraits 

gibbosa
Flora of Afghanistan
Flora of Iran
Flora of Pakistan
Flora of Turkmenistan
Flora of the Transcaucasus
Plants described in 1846
Taxa named by Pierre Edmond Boissier